This is a list of some collegiate glee clubs located in the United States.

References

 
Glee clubs, collegiate